Mar Abimalek Timotheus (28 August 1878 – 30 April 1945) was an Assyrian priest of the Church of the East who served as Metropolitan of Malabar and All India from 1907 until his death in 1945. Born in the village of Mar Bisho in the Ottoman Empire, he was sent to India by Catholicos-Patriarch Shimun XIX after Shimun received a petition to appoint a bishop from the Chaldean Syrian Church in Trichur (now Thrissur). 

The Holy Synod of the Assyrian Church of the East announced that Timotheus would be canonised in May 2018 following the adoption of a new procedure for canonisation, and his sainthood was formally proclaimed by Catholicos-Patriarch Gewargis III on 29 September 2019.

References

Further reading

 
 
 
 
 

|-

1878 births
1945 deaths
Christian clergy from the Ottoman Empire
Christian clergy from Thrissur
20th-century bishops of the Assyrian Church of the East
Assyrian Church of the East saints
Church of the East in India
Assyrian saints
20th-century Christian saints